José Luis Morales (born 2 October 1950) is a Mexican rower. He competed in the men's coxless four event at the 1972 Summer Olympics.

References

1950 births
Living people
Mexican male rowers
Olympic rowers of Mexico
Rowers at the 1972 Summer Olympics
Place of birth missing (living people)